Voodoo Woman is a 1957 horror film directed by Edward L. Cahn and starring  Marla English in her final film role, Tom Conway, and Mike Connors. It was released in March 1957 by American International Pictures as a double feature with The Undead. 

In 1966, it was remade by Larry Buchanan into an AIP made for television film, Curse of the Swamp Creature.

Plot
Harry West (Norman Willis) discovers gold in the idol worshipped by a jungle voodoo tribe in Bantalaya, a French-owned jungle colony. Harry enlists a pair of treasure hunters from the United States, one of them being the beautiful but ruthless Marilyn Blanchard (Marla English). Hoping to take the treasure for themselves, Marilyn murders Harry and steals his map. They con the innocent Ted Bronson (Mike Connors) into acting as a jungle guide and leading them to the tribe that owns the idol.

Meanwhile, Dr. Roland Gerard (Tom Conway), a mad scientist who has exiled himself deep in the same jungle, is using a combination of native voodoo and his own biochemical discoveries in an attempt to create a superhuman being.  He hopes that this being, possessing the best of man and beast, will be the mother of a new perfect and deathless race which he will control with a mixture of hypnosis and telepathy.  He is accompanied by his wife, Susan (Mary Ellen Kay), who no longer loves Dr. Gerard but is prevented from leaving by her husband and the natives.

Dr. Gerard's initial attempts to create a female superbeing are a failure because the transformation is only temporary and the native girl used as the subject of the experiment lacks the killer instinct he deems necessary to carryout his instructions.  However, when he meets the treasure hunters, he decides that Marilyn would be a perfect subject for his experiment. He successfully turns her into an invulnerable monster, but when she learns her quest for gold was in vain, he loses his mental control over her and she destroys him. Ted and Susan are able to escape in the ensuing chaos. After becoming human again, Marilyn tries to salvage the idol which has almost fallen into a poisonous gas pit which the natives use for their sacrifices, and she accidentally loses her balance and falls into it herself.

Cast
 Marla English as Marilyn Blanchard, a treasure huntress who ventures into the jungle along with Rick to hunt for treasure. 
 Lance Fuller as Rick Brady, Marilyn's partner and fellow treasure hunter who joins her in the hopes of finding the treasure and poses as businessman Harry West to Teddy. 
 Tom Conway as Dr. Roland Gerard, a mad scientist who is planning to make a monster who obeys his commands by the use of voodoo magic. 
 Mary Ellen Kay as Susan Gerard, the doctor's wife who is suspicious of her husband's work whilst also being scared of what he's slowly becoming. 
 Mike "Touch" Connors as Ted Bronson, a jungle guide who joins Marilyn and Rick (posing as Harry West) to unknowingly search for the treasure. 
 Martin Wilkins as Chaka the witch doctor, a witch doctor who along with Roland, tried to create the perfect voodoo monster. 
 Paul Blaisdell as The Voodoo Women, monsters that a created and commanded by Dr. Gerard. 
 Otis Greene as Bobo, the houseboy who is assigned to take care of Susan. 
 Emmett Smith as Gandor, Roland and Chaka's henchman 
 Jean Davis as Zaranda, an African girl who is used by Roland to turn into a voodoo monster. 
 Paul Dubov as Marcel, the bar owner who helps Rick and Marilyn kill Harry. 
 Giselle D'Arc as Yvette, the bargirl and singer at Marcel's bar 
 Norman Willis as Harry West, a businessman who finds the voodoo woman curse first and faces off against Rick and Marilyn for it.

Production
 
Paul Blaisdell who played the monsters and also appeared as a drunken customer in the bar room sequence believed that as producer Alex Gordon had a big hit with The She-Creature, he decided to produce a second film for American International Pictures about a female monster. As the scriptwriters of that film were busy on other films, Gordon turned over the writing to actor Russ Bender, who was a pre-war pulp fiction writer and V.I. Voss. (It wound up being the only script Bender would ever write.)

Blaisdell recalled the shoot was not a pleasant one. A prop man handed Tom Conway a small vial of real acid in one scene that was to be poured on the creature's leg, and Blaisdell wound up with a scar on his shin that lasted the rest of his life. Marla English developed a bad case of flu, and Lance Fuller and Mike Connors had a "Who can be taller?" contest with each actor adding higher lifts to their shoes.

Originally titled Black Voodoo, the film was shot during the frigid California winter of 1956-57 under a fast working schedule of six days and a budget of $80,000. Producer Alex Gordon wanted Peter Lorre who again refused to work with him and then called George Zucco, the star of Voodoo Man, who was too ill to work. With the shooting date drawing near, Tom Conway was chosen, who like Marla English and Paul Dubov, had also been in The She-Creature. Publicity for the film declared "Not since he starred in The Cat People and I Walked with a Zombie has Tom had a role like his current one!".

In an interview with Tom Weaver, Mike Connors said, 

The original make-up design for the Voodoo Woman was deemed unsuitable at the last minute and the title monster is actually the She Creature costume hurriedly stripped of its tail, fins and pincer-like claws. What remained was the bulky Thing-style body, which was wrapped in a burlap sarong and topped with a modified skull mask and big blond wig.  Cahn worked actively to conceal this fact, using quick cuts and keeping her mostly in shadows or behind foliage.  The rumbling growl of a lion was also dubbed for added effect. Makeup man Harry Thomas supplied the skull mask and wig for the monster (purchased from a Halloween costume store), but it looked so phony, at the last minute, Blaisdell had to totally rework the head to make it look more acceptable.

Lance Fuller reportedly had a two-films-a-year deal over five years with Golden State Productions.

Reception
In his The Pit and the Pen column in Fangoria magazine producer Alex Gordon revealed that the movie nearly caused a break-up with his then-fiance Ruth Alexander.  Proud of the finished production he took her to see it at its Burbank premiere only to have her hand back his engagement ring when it was over, telling him that he should be making prestigious high class art films and not trash like this. Luckily, his brother Richard was able to explain to her the differences between low budget and big budget film-making, and she and Alex were eventually married, with her later actually scripting several of his features.

Soundtrack
Darrell Calker composed scores for more than 200 movies, both live action and cartoons, where he was the musical director for Walter Lantz Productions.

Giselle D'Arc, born Giselle Camille Prugnard, was a soprano vocalist with a five-octave range. In addition to singing the title song in her role as a bargirl, she provided vocals for the film's score. Whilst she was singing for Liberty Records, she was discovered by Jeff Chandler who brought her into motion pictures. She later married Clint Walker.

Black Voodoo
Lyrics by John Blackburn
Music by Darrell Calker 
Sung by Giselle D'Arc (AKA Giselle Camille Prugnard Hennessy)

Quotes
We're doing it Chaka. White man's science and the black voodoo. - Dr. Roland Gerard

See also
 List of American films of 1957

References

External links 

 
 
 
 

1957 horror films
1957 films
American supernatural horror films
Films directed by Edward L. Cahn
1950s English-language films
American International Pictures films
American black-and-white films
American independent films
American zombie films
Films about Voodoo
Films set in Africa
Mad scientist films
1950s independent films
1950s supernatural horror films
1950s American films